Crosscut Peak is a peak,  high, just north of Joice Icefall in the Millen Range, Victoria Land, Antarctica. The topographical feature was so named by the Southern Party of the New Zealand Federated Mountain Clubs Antarctic Expedition (NZFMCAE), 1962–63, due to its jagged northern ridge and summit. The peak lies on the Pennell Coast, a portion of Antarctica lying between Cape Williams and Cape Adare.

References
 

Mountains of Victoria Land
Pennell Coast